Ludwig Maurer (11 December 1859 – 10 January 1927) was a German mathematician and professor at University of Tübingen. He was the eldest son of Konrad Maurer (1823–1902) and Valerie Maurer, née von Faulhaber (1833–1912). His 1887 dissertation at the University of Strassburg was on the theory of linear substitutions, known today as matrix groups.

See also
Maurer–Cartan form

References

External links
 

1859 births
1927 deaths
19th-century German mathematicians
20th-century German mathematicians